The 2016–17 Seton Hall Pirates men's basketball team represented Seton Hall University in the 2016–17 NCAA Division I men's basketball season. The Pirates played home games in Newark, New Jersey at the Prudential Center, with one exhibition and one regular season game at Walsh Gymnasium in South Orange, New Jersey.  They were coached, for the seventh year, by Kevin Willard. They were members of the Big East Conference. They finished the season 21–12, 10–8 in Big East play to finish in a four-way tie for third place. As the No. 5 seed in the Big East tournament, they defeated Marquette before losing to Villanova in the semifinals. They received an at-large bid to the NCAA tournament as a No. 9 seed in the South region where they lost to Arkansas in the first round.

Previous season
The Pirates finished the 2015–16 season 25–9, 12–6 in Big East play to finish in third place. They defeated Creighton, Xavier, and Villanova to win the Big East tournament. As a result, they received the conference's automatic bid to the NCAA tournament where they lost in the first round to Gonzaga.

Preseason 
Prior to the season, Seton Hall was picked to finish in a tie for fourth place in a poll of Big East coaches. Khadeen Carrington and Angel Delgado were named to the preseason All-Big East second team.

Departures

Incoming transfers

Incoming recruits

Roster

Schedule and results
 
|-
!colspan=9 style=| Non-conference regular season

|-
!colspan=9 style=| Big East regular season

|-
!colspan=9 style=| Big East tournament

|-
!colspan=9 style=| NCAA tournament

Rankings

References

Seton Hall
Seton Hall Pirates men's basketball seasons
Seton Hall
Seton Hall
Seton Hall